Popoudina aliena is a moth in the family Erebidae. It was described by Sergius G. Kiriakoff in 1954. It is found in the Democratic Republic of the Congo.

References

Moths described in 1954
Spilosomina
Endemic fauna of the Democratic Republic of the Congo